Marc Evans Knapper is an American diplomat who has served as the United States Ambassador to Vietnam since February 2022.

Education 

Knapper earned his Bachelor of Arts from Princeton University and his Master of Arts from the Army War College.

Career 

Knapper is a career member of the Senior Foreign Service, class of Minister-Counselor. He previously served as the Chargé d’Affaires of the U.S. embassy in Seoul, South Korea and, prior to that, was the embassy’s deputy chief of mission. Earlier, Knapper was director of the State Department’s Office of India Affairs and director of the State Department’s office of Japanese Affairs. From 2004 to 2007, he was political affairs counselor at the U.S. embassy in Hanoi. His other assignments include leadership positions in the U.S. Embassy in Baghdad, Iraq, and the U.S. Embassy in Tokyo, Japan.

Ambassador to Vietnam

On April 15, 2021, President Joe Biden nominated Knapper to be the next United States Ambassador to Vietnam. Hearings were held before the Senate Foreign Relations Committee on his nomination on July 13, 2021. The committee favorably reported his nomination to the Senate floor on August 4, 2021. Knapper was confirmed by the Senate by voice vote on December 18, 2021. He was sworn into office on January 3, 2022. 

Knapper presented his credentials to president Nguyễn Xuân Phúc on February 11, 2022.

Recognition 

Knapper is the recipient of numerous awards, including the Secretary of State’s Distinguished Service award, the State Department’s Linguist of the Year award, and a Presidential Rank award.

Personal life
Knapper speaks Japanese, Korean and Vietnamese. He and his wife, Suzuko, have a son, Alexander.

See also
List of ambassadors of the United States

References

External links

Living people
Year of birth missing (living people)
Place of birth missing (living people)
21st-century American diplomats
Ambassadors of the United States to Vietnam
Princeton University alumni
United States Army War College alumni
United States Department of State officials
United States Foreign Service personnel